El regalo is a 2008 Chilean romantic comedy film directed by Cristián Galaz & Andrea Ugalde and written by Galaz, Ugalde, Mateo Iribarren & Orlando Lübbert. It stars Nelson Villagra, Jamie Vadell, Julio Jung, Delfina Guzmán and Gloria Munchmeyer. It premiered on October 2, 2008 in Chilean theaters.

Synopsis 
Francisco is going through one of the hardest moments of his life, right now that he has just retired to spend more time with his wife, she has just become ill and died suddenly. Francisco is devastated, he could not imagine a day of his life without his wife and he even considers the option of suicide.

Pachecho and Tito have been their best friends for many years and to cheer up their friend they decide to give him a gift, to invite him to a five-star all-inclusive resort for a week. Francisco reluctantly accepts the gift and once there he will realize that even though the years go by, he can still have a very young and alive spirit. Together with his friends and a love of youth, he will live one of the happiest weeks of his life, which will end up changing the lives of all of them.

Cast 
The actors participating in this film are:

 Nelson Villagra as Francisco
 Jamie Vadell as Pacheco
 Julio Jung as Tito
 Delfina Guzmán as Carmen
 Hector Noguera as Nicholas
 Gloria Munchmeyer as Lucy
 Francis Rodriguez as Mario
 Jorge Arecheta as Student
 Mario Soto as Teacher 1

References

External links 

 

2008 films
2008 romantic comedy films
Chilean comedy films
Chilean romance films
2000s Spanish-language films
Films set in Chile
Films shot in Chile
Films set in resorts
Films about old age
Films about widowhood
Chilean romantic comedy films